David Fitzpatrick is the name of:

 David Fitzpatrick (footballer, born 1990), English footballer
 David Fitzpatrick (footballer, born 1995), English footballer
 David P. B. Fitzpatrick (1948–2019), Irish historian